Spectacular Blue Smith (born September 7, 1986), known by his stage name Spectacular, is an American entertainer, keynote speaker, entrepreneur, television personality, author, and philanthropist. He is the Chairman and CEO of Adwizar Inc. and founder of the record label Mula Music Group. 

Black Enterprise estimated his net worth is $65 million, making him one of the five most influential entrepreneurs in music and tech, and is the creator of Grumpy Cat viral brand.

Career
Smith started performing with his brother in a hip hop group called Pretty Ricky. at the age of 11. His father, Joseph "Blue" Smith, of Jamaican descent, was the owner of the indie label and managed the group. Smith contributed musically and also choreographed the group's stage performances as they signed a deal with Atlantic Records. The band went on the Scream IV tour as they promoted songs such as "Grind With Me" and "Your Body".

Aside from being a recording artist, Smith is also an entrepreneur. Intrigued by the business possibilities of social media, he experimented with Pretty Ricky's Facebook page, testing out theories behind social networks for a full year until he found a system for gaining and monetizing followers. He then turned those ideas into Adwizar, a company that manages and monetizes social media accounts. The company manages social media pages of artists such as Bow Wow, Kevin Gates, Soulja Boy, Master P, Birdman, and Bone Thugs-n-Harmony. Smith is the creator of Grumpy Cat, a social media brand that has gone viral and is claimed to have made him a $100 million.

On February 14, 2017, Smith released his first book, titled Spectacular Love: How to Make Good Love Last, published by Bluestar Books.

2020 
On December 7, 2020, Smith allegedly fake-sneezed and said "Coronavirus", resulting in an argument between him and a Disney employee. Smith eventually responded physically. According to an arrest affidavit from the Orange County Sheriff's Office, Smith accidentally punched the Disney employee while falling. Smith later responded that "There's 2 sides to every story."

Honors and awards
2019 - Innovator Of The Year by Black Enterprise
2018 - Top 5 Most Influential Entrepreneurs in Tech and Music by Black Enterprise
2018 - The 10 Most Inspiring Business Leaders by Mirror Review
2017 - Greatest and Most Inspiring Entrepreneur by Inc. Magazine
2017 - Top 10 Marketing Gurus To Watch in 2018 by Huffington Post
2019 - 14 Entrepreneurial Thought Leaders From Black Twitter by Black Enterprise
2019 - Best Privately Owned Company In America by Entrepreneur Magazine

Discography

Singles 
2005: "Grind with Me"
2005: "Your Body"
2006: "Nothing but a Number"
2006: "On the Hotline"
2007: "Love Like Honey"
2008: "Knockin Boots 08"
2008: "Cuddle Up" (featuring Butta Creame)
2009: "Tipsy (In Dis Club)"
2009: "Say a Command"
2010: "Personal Freak"
2010: "Cookie Cutter"
2011: "Topless"
2015: "Puddles"

Filmography

Television

External links 

 Adwizar - Smith's company
 Grumpy Cat Twitter Page

References 

Living people
21st-century American businesspeople
21st-century American musicians
American hip hop singers
1986 births